The Vânători-Neamț Natural Park is situated in north-east Romania, in Neamț County, on the border with Suceava County. It lies on the administrative territories of the communes Agapia, Bălțătești, Brusturi, Crăcăoani, Vânători-Neamț, Răucești, Boroaia (Suceava), and the town of Târgu Neamț.

Vânători Park is one of the few places where the European bison (Bison bonasus) can be seen. There are 17 such zimbrii in a protected  area in Vânători-Neamț commune. The aurochs head ("cap de bour" in Romanian) is the heraldic symbol of the historical province of Moldavia, although the aurochs (now extinct) was a separate species from the European bison.

Gallery

References

External links

 Park's website 

Protected areas of Romania
Geography of Neamț County
Tourist attractions in Neamț County
Nature reserves in Romania